Wallace M. Alexander (1869–1939) was an American heir, businessman and philanthropist.

Biography

Early life
Wallace McKinney Alexander was born on November 10, 1869 in Maui, Hawaii. His father was Samuel Thomas Alexander. His mother was Martha E. (Cooke) Alexander. His paternal grandfather, William Patterson Alexander, was a missionary in Hawaii. His maternal grandfather, Amos Starr Cooke, was a Hawaii missionary and founder of the Castle & Cooke company.

Alexander grew up in Oakland, California and was educated at Oakland High School, then Phillips Andover Academy in Andover, Massachusetts. He graduated from Yale University in 1892.

Career
Alexander owned sugarcane plantations as well as sugar refining factories in Hawaii. He served on the Board of Directors of Alexander and Baldwin. He also served as the Vice President of the Matson Navigation Company and the Honolulu Oil Corporation.

He served as president of the San Francisco Chamber of Commerce. He was also a powerbroker in the Republican Party of San Francisco. In 1928, he suggested prohibiting mutual immigration between the United States and Japan; the idea was rejected by Japan.

Philanthropy
Alexander served on the board of trustees of the Carnegie Endowment for International Peace. He was a member of the Japan Society of San Francisco and a co-founder of the Institute of Pacific Relations. He supported the Boy Scouts of America.

He served as president of the San Francisco Opera. He also served on the Board of Trustees of Stanford University in Stanford, near Palo Alto, having been first elected in 1924 and re-elected in 1934.

He received the Legion of Honor from France in 1937.

Personal life
Alexander married Mary S. Baker in 1904,a classmate for when Alexander attended Oakland public schools., As an adult he lived in Piedmont, California and moved back to Hawaii where he died.

Death
Alexander died on November 22, 1939 in Honolulu, Hawaii. He was seventy years old.

References

1869 births
1939 deaths
People from Maui
Businesspeople from Honolulu
Businesspeople from Oakland, California
Businesspeople from San Francisco
Phillips Academy alumni
Yale University alumni
American corporate directors
Philanthropists from California
Stanford University trustees